Cryptic crosswords often use abbreviations to clue individual letters or short fragments of the overall solution. These include:
 Any conventional abbreviations found in a standard dictionary, such as:
 "current": AC (for "alternating current"); less commonly, DC (for "direct current"); or even I (the symbol used in physics and electronics)
 Roman numerals: for example the word "six" in the clue might be used to indicate the letters VI
 The name of a chemical element may be used to signify its symbol; e.g., W for tungsten
 The days of the week; e.g., TH for Thursday 
 Country codes; e.g., "Switzerland" can indicate the letters CH
 ICAO spelling alphabet: where Mike signifies M and Romeo R
 Conventional abbreviations for US cities and states: for example, "New York" can indicate NY and "California" CA or CAL.

The abbreviation is not always a short form of the word used in the clue. For example:
 "Knight" for N (the symbol used in chess notation)

Taking this one stage further, the clue word can hint at the word or words to be abbreviated rather than giving the word itself. For example:
 "About" for C or CA (for "circa"), or RE.
 "Say" for EG, used to mean "for example".

More obscure clue words of this variety include:
 "Model" for T, referring to the Model T.
 "Beginner" or synonyms such as "novice" or "student" for L, as in L-plate.
 "Bend" for S or U (as in "S-bend" and "U-bend")
 "Books" for OT or NT, as in Old Testament or New Testament.
 "Sailor" for AB, abbreviation of able seaman.
 "Take" for R, abbreviation of the Latin word recipe, meaning "take".

Most abbreviations can be found in the Chambers Dictionary as this is the dictionary primarily used by crossword setters. However, some abbreviations may be found in other dictionaries, such as the Collins English Dictionary and Oxford English Dictionary.

Clues beginning with A
 Aboard – SS, or a word inside the letters SS
 About – C or CA (circa) or RE
 Academic – DD (doctor of divinity) or PROF
 Acceleration – G
Accepted – A 
 Account – AC
 Accountant – CA (chartered accountant)
 Ace – A or AI (A-1)
 Advert – AD
 Afternoon – PM
 Against – V or VS (versus)
 Agent – REP (representative)
 Agricultural – AG
 Air conditioning – AC
 Airman – AC (aircraftman)
 Alien – ET (extraterrestrial)
 Also known as – AKA
 Aluminium – AL (chemical symbol)
 Alumnus – OB (old boy) or OG (old girl)
 Ambassador – HE (his/her excellency)
 America – A, AM, US or USA (United States of America)
American – GI (U.S. soldier)
 American ship – USS
 Amnesty – AI (Amnesty International)
 Anglican – CE (Church of England)
 Answer – A
 Arbiter – REF (referee)
 Archdeacon – VEN (Venerable)
 Area – A
 Army cop – MP (Military Policeman)
 Army corps – REME (Royal Electrical and Mechanical Engineers (British army))
 Arsenic – AS (chemical symbol)
 Article - A, AN, THE
 Artificial intelligence – AI
 Artillery – RA (Royal Artillery)
 Artist – RA (Royal Academy)
 At home – IN
 Atmosphere – AT
 Attorney – DA (District Attorney) or PA (Practicing Attorney)
 Australia – A, AUS or OZ (slang name for Australia)
 Avenue – AVE
 Award – OM (Order of Merit)

Clues beginning with B
 Bachelor of Arts – BA
 Bachelor of Medicine – BM, MB
 Base – E (mathematical constant)
 Basque nationalists – ETA
 Bearing – N, E, S, W, NE, NW, etc. (compass points)
 Beginner – L (for Learner)
 Bend – S or U (U-bend and S-bend)
 Bible – AV (King James bible Authorized version)
 Bill – AC (account), IOU, TAB
 Bishop – B or RR (Right Reverend) or DD (Doctor of Divinity)
 Bob – S (shilling)
 Book (or books) – B, NT (New Testament), OT (Old Testament), MS (Manuscript), GEN (Genesis), AV (Authorised Version of the Bible)
 Bowled – B (Cricket scorecard)
 Boy – B
 Bridge player – N, E, S, W
 Byte – B

Clues beginning with C
 Calcium – CA
 California – CA
 Cape – C
 Car – T (Model T), RR (Rolls-Royce)
 Cardinal – N, E, S, W, RED (a vivid shade of red, which may get its name from the cassocks worn by Catholic cardinals)
 Care of – CO
 Caught – C or CT
 Celsius – C
 Cent – C
 Centigrade – C
 Century – C
 Certificate – X, U, PG, R, G (from the film certificates)
 Charged – ION
 Charlie – C (NATO phonetic alphabet)
 Chartered accountant – CA
 Chief – CH
 Chlorine – CL (chemical symbol)
 Chromosome – X or Y
 Church – CH or CE (Church of England) or RC (Roman Catholic)
 Circa – C
 Circle – O (the letter O is a circle)
 City – NY (New York), LA (Los Angeles), or EC (postcode for City of London)
 Closed - TO (like a door)
 Club – Y (YMCA)
 Coin – P (penny), D (from the Latin denarius) or C (cent) – D or C would usually have "old" or "American" as well as "coin".
 Cold – C
 Colonel – COL
 Colt – C
 Commercial – AD
 Communist – RED
 Companion – CH (Order of the Companions of Honour)
 Company – CO
 Compare – CF (abbreviation of the Latin confer)
 Compass point – N, E, S, W (and other bearings)
 Computer – PC
 Concerning – RE
 Conservationists – NT (National Trust)
 Conservative – C, CON, TORY
 Constable – PC (police constable)
 Constant – E, PI, or K (mathematical constants)
 Copper – P (penny), D (denarius), CU (chemical symbol), PC (police constable)
 Corner – .SE, NW, NE, SW
 Councillor – CL, CLR, CLLR
 Court – CT
 Credit – CR
 Criminal – CON
 Cross – X
 Current – AC (alternating current), DC (direct current), I (The conventional symbol for current is I, which originates from the French phrase intensité du courant), AD (Anno Domini) or AMP (Ampere)
 Current account – CA
 Cystic fibrosis – CF

Clues beginning with D
 Date – D
 Daughter – D
 Dead or Died – D, DEC (deceased), EX, OB (abbreviation)
 Debts – IOUS (IOU)
 Deceased – D, DEC, EX
 Decoration – VC (Victoria Cross), GC (George Cross), MM (Military Medal)
 Degree – DEG, C (Celsius or Centigrade), F (Fahrenheit), BA (Bachelor of Arts), MA (Master of Arts).
 Democrat – D
Departs – D
 Detective – DS (Detective Sergeant)
 Detective inspector – DI
 Detectives – CID, YARD (Scotland Yard)
 Deutschmark – DM
 Dial - O
 Dictionary - OED (Oxford English Dictionary)
 Dinner jacket – DJ
 Direction – N, E, S, W (and other compass bearings)
 Director – D
 Disc – O (the letter O is round, like a disc), EP (extended play record), LP (long play record), CD (compact disc)
 Disease – TB, ME
 Doctor – DOC, BM (Bachelor of Medicine), MB (Medicinae Baccalaureus), MD (Medicinae Doctor), MO (medical officer), GP (General Practitioner), DR
 Doctor of Divinity – DD
 Drama – NOH (Japanese drama Noh)
 Drama Company – REP
 Drip – IV (intravenous drip)
 Drug – C (cocaine), E, X (both short for ecstasy) or H (heroin)
 Dry – TT (teetotal) or AA (Alcoholics Anonymous)
 Duck – O (from the cricket score of 0)
 Ducks – OO
 Duke – D

Clues beginning with E
 Each – EA
 Earl – E
 East – E
 East Germany – GDR (German Democratic Republic)
 Echo – E
 Ecstasy – E or X (slang names for the drug)
 Editor – ED
 Egg – O (the letter O loosely resembles the shape of an egg)
 Elected – IN
 Electricity – AC (alternating current), DC (direct current)
 Eleven – II (II looks similar to 11), or XI (Roman numerals)
 End of war – VE (Victory in Europe, the end of World War II)
 Energy – E, J (joule)
 Engagement - GIG
 Engineer – CE (civil engineer) or RE (Royal Engineer) or ME (mechanical engineer)
 English – E
 Escape – ESC
 Established – EST
 Estimated time of arrival – ETA
 Europe – EU (European Union), EC (European Community)
European - E
 [for] Everyone - U ('Universal' BBFC rating)
 Excellent – AI (looks like 'A1' (first-class, first-rate, top-notch))
 Exercise – PE (physical education), PT (physical training), TRAIN
 Extra – W (from the extra runs in cricket for a wide ball)
 Extra large – XL
 Extra terrestrial – ET

Clues beginning with F
 Fahrenheit – F
 Father – DA, DAD, FR, PA
 Fellow – F
 Female – F
 Fifty – L (Roman numeral (lower case L))
 Fighter plane – MIG (type of plane)
 Fine – F
 Firm – CO (company)
 Five – V (Roman numeral)
 Fleet – RN (Royal Navy)
 Flying bomb – VI (looks like V1)
 Following – F
 Football association – FA
 Football club – FC
 For example – EG (e.g., short for the Latin exempli gratia)
 Force – F, G (gravity), N (newton)
 Former – EX
 Four – IV (Roman Numeral)
 France – F
 Frenchman – M (Monsieur)

Clues beginning with G
 Game – RU (Rugby Union)
 Gangster/gang leader – AL (Al Capone)
 Gas – H (hydrogen), O (oxygen), N (nitrogen), CS (tear gas)
Genetic code – DNA  or RNA
 German submarine – U (U-boat)
 Germany – GER, D (Deutschland)
 Glasses – OO
 Gold – AU (chemical symbol), OR (in heraldry)
 Good – PI (pious)
 Good Man – ST (abbreviation for Saint)
 Graduate – BA, MA (university degrees)
 Gram – G
 Grand – G, M (Roman numeral for 1000), K (kilo-)
 Grand prix – GP
 Group – GP
 Gunners/Gunmen – RA (Royal Artillery)
 Gym – PE (Physical Education) or PT (Physical Training)

Clues beginning with H
 Hand – N, E, S, W (Bridge hands)
 Hard – H
 Hear – T (Position on hearing aid)
 Hectare – HA
 Helium – HE
 Henry – H
 Heroin – H
 Hesitation – ER
 Hire purchase – HP
 Hole – O
 Holy man – ST (saint)
 Home - IN (opposite of 'out')
 Home counties – SE (South East England)
 Honours – BA or MA (see Degree)
 Horse – G, GG (slang), COP, NAG
 Hospital – H
 Hospital Department – AE (Accident & Emergency), ENT (Ear, Nose & Throat)
 Hour – H, HR
 House – HO
 Houses of Parliament – HP
 Hug - O (the symbol for a hug)
 Hundred – C (Roman numeral), TON
 Husband – H
 Hydrogen – H

Clues beginning with I
 Iceland – IS (country code)
 Image – PIC
 Inch – IN
 Independent – I or IND
 Information technology – IT
 Initials – inits.
 Inspector – DI (Detective inspector)
 Intelligence – IQ
 Internet/internet provider – ISP (internet service provider)
 Iodine – I (chemical symbol)
 Ireland – IRE
 Irish Republican Army – IRA
 Iron – FE (chemical symbol)
 Island – IS or I
 Isle of Man – IOM

Clues beginning with J
 Jack – J, TAR, AB (sailor)
 Jet – MIG (type of plane)
 Jolly – RM (Royal Marine)
 Journalist – ED (editor)
 Judge – J, REF
 Junction – T (T-junction)
 Junior – JR

Clues beginning with K
 Kelvin – K
 Kentucky – KY
 Key – A, B, C, D, E, F or G (musical keys), ALT, ESC, DEL (computer keyboard keys)
 Kick off – KO
 Kilo – K
 King – K, R (from the Latin rex), HM (His Majesty), or GR (George Rex), or CR (Charles Rex). Also BB (B.B. King, singer-songwriter)
 Kiss – X (the symbol for a kiss)
 Knave – J (Jack)
 Knight – K, KT, KBE (Knight Commander of the Order of the British Empire) or KG (Knight of the Garter) or N (the symbol for a knight on a chessboard)
 Knock out – KO
 Knot – KT

Clues beginning with L
 Labour – LAB
 Lake – L or LA
 Landlord - LETTER (somebody who lets property)
 Large – L
 Large number – C, D, M (Roman numerals) or K (kilo-)
 Last – Z (the last letter of the alphabet)
 Last month – ULT (ultimo)
 Latin – L or LAT
 Lawrence – DH (D. H. Lawrence) or TE (T. E. Lawrence)
 Lawyer – DA
 Lead – PB (chemical symbol)
 Learner – L
 Lecturer – L
 Left – L
 Leg – ON (cricket: 'on' side = leg side)  
 Liberal – L or LIB
 Lieutenant – LT
 Line – L
 Lines – LL, RY (railway), BR (British Rail)
 Literary/Literature – LIT
 Litre – L
 Local area network – LAN
London Philharmonic Orchestra – LPO
 Long playing record – LP
 Long wave – LW
 Look – LO
 Lord – LD
 Los Angeles – LA
 Loud – F (forte) or FF (fortissimo)
 Love – O (zero score in tennis)
 Low - MOO

Clues beginning with M
 Madame – MME (as in French)
 Maiden – M (cricket terminology for no runs in an over)
 Male – M, HE or PA
 Manager – MIC (man in charge)
 Many – Any Roman numeral(s) of considerable size
 Map-makers – OS (Ordnance Survey)
 Marines – RM (Royal Marines)
 Married – M
 Master – M
 Master of Arts – MA
 Master of ceremonies – MC
 Master's – MA (Master of Arts degree)
 Medal – VC (Victoria Cross), GC (George Cross), OBE (Order of the British Empire), OM (Order of Merit)
 Medic – DOC (short for doctor), BM (Bachelor of Medicine), MB (Medicinae Baccalaureus), MD (Medicinae Doctor), MO (medical officer), GP (General Practitioner), DR (short for doctor)
 Mediterranean Sea – MED
 Mega – M
 Megabyte – MB
 Member – MP (same as Member of Parliament (below)), ARM, LEG, words for male genitals
 Member of Parliament – MP
 Men – OR (Other ranks)
 Messerschmitt – ME
Metre – M
 Middle East – ME
 Midfielder – L (the 'mid' letter of 'fielder')
 Military Police – MP
 Million – M
 Minister - MP, Rev 
 Ministry of Defence – MOD
 Minute – M
 Model – T (Model T Ford)
 Monarch – CR (Charles Rex), ER (Elizabeth Regina), GR (George Rex), Q (queen), K (king) or R (rex/regina)
 Monsieur – M
 Morning or Half Day – AM
 Mother – MA
 Motor racing – FI (as in F1, Formula One)
 Motorway – M or MI (looks like M1)
 Murderer - CAIN (killed his brother Abel in the Book of Genesis

Clues beginning with N
 Namely – SC, SS (both from the Latin scilicet), alternative to IE
 National Trust – NT
 Navy – RN (Royal Navy), ABS (able-bodied seamen) or TARS (slang for seamen)
 Nazis – SS (Schutzstaffel)
 Neon – NE (chemical symbol)
 Never-never – HP (synonym for hire purchase)
 New – N
 New Testament – NT
 Newspaper – RAG, FT (Financial Times)
 Nitrogen – N
 No ball – NB (cricket terminology)
 Noon – M, N
 North – N
 Not applicable – NA
 Note – NB (from the Latin nota bene), PS (from postscript at the end of a letter) or A, B, C, D, E, F, G (musical notes) or DO, RE, MI, FA, SO/SOH, LA, TE/TI (musical notes). LA is most commonly referenced.
 Nothing – O (the letter O looks like the number 0), FA (from Fanny Adams)
 Notice – D (from D-Notice)
 Now – AD (from the Latin Anno Domini)
 Number – NO, V, X, C, D, M, L (Roman numerals)
 Nurse – EN (enrolled nurse), SEN (State Enrolled Nurse) or RN (registered nurse)

Clues beginning with O
 Odds – SP (starting price)
 Officer – OC (Officer Corps) or CO (Commanding Officer)
 Old – O, OL (e.g. "good ol' boy")
 Old man – PA, DAD
 Old person – OAP
 Old Testament – OT
 One – I (I is the Roman numeral for 1) or rarely A, AN (not normally used in British crosswords), ACE (playing card)
 Operating system – OS
 Operation – OP
 Order – OM (Order of Merit)
 Ordinary Seaman – OS, Rating
 Oriental – E (East)
 Other Ranks – OR (military term for non-commissioned ranks)
 Ounce – OZ (abbreviation)
 Outsized – OS
 Over – O
 Over the top – OTT
 Overdose – OD
 Oversize – OS
 Oxygen – O

Clues beginning with P
 Page – P
 Painters – RA (Royal Academy)
 Pair – PR
 Paramilitaries – ETA (Basque Nationalists), IRA (Irish Republican Army), UFF (Ulster Freedom Fighters), UDA (Ulster Defence Association)
 Parking – P
 Party – LAB, LIB or LD, CON or C or TORY (UK political parties), DO
 Peacekeepers – UN (United Nations)
 Pencil – HB
 Penny – P, D (old penny), CU (copper)
 Phone company – BT
 Physical education – PE
 Physical training – PT
 Piano – P
 Pig - SOW
 Pint – PT
 Place – PL, SET, SITE, SPOT
 Plane – MIG (type of plane)
 Plate – L or P (L-plate and P-plate)
 Please – O (as in 'O..!', an interjection sometimes used as a plea in poetry)
 Poem – IF (Kipling)
 Poet – PO, TS (T.S. Eliot)
 Point – N, E, S, W (and other compass bearings)
 Pole – N (north) or S (south)
 Policeman/men – PC (Police Constable), DI (Detective Inspector), MET (Metropolitan Police), CID (Criminal Investigation Department)
 Politician – MP
 Posh – U (short for upper class)
 Post office – PO
 Potassium – K (chemical symbol)
 Pound – LB (weight), L (from £)
 Priest – PR, REV (reverend), RR (Right Reverend), DD (Doctor of Divinity), FR (Father), ELI (Eli (Bible))
 Prime Minister – PM
 Prisoner of war – POW
 Promises – IOUS (I owe yous)
 Province – NI (Northern Ireland)
 Pub – PH (Public House)

Clues beginning with Q
 Quarter – N, S, E, W (compass direction)
 Quartet – IV (four in Roman numerals)
 Queen – Q, ER (Elizabeth Regina), HM (Her Majesty)
 Quiet/quietly – P (piano), SH

Clues beginning with R
 Race – TT (Isle of Man TT)
 Railway – R, RY, BR (British Rail), EL (Chicago "L")
 Rated – X (film rating)
 Rechabite – TT (Rechabite – tee-total)
 Record – EP (extended play record), LP (long playing record)
 Ref – UMP (referee – umpire)
 Regina – R
 Republican – R, GOP (Grand Old Party)
 Resistance – R (physics)
 Retired – RET
 Reverend – RR (Right Reverend), DD (Doctor of Divinity), REV
 Rex – R
 Right – R
 Right Reverend – RR
 Ring – O (the letter O looks like a ring)
 River – R, MA (Ma River)
 Road – RD or AI (looks like A1)
 Rolls-Royce – RR
 Roman Catholic – RC
 Rook – R
 Round – O (the letter O is round)
 Royal Academy – RA
 Royal Artillery – RA
 Royal Engineers – RE
 Royal Marines – RM
 Royal Navy – RN
 Rugby (Union) – RU
 Run – R
 Rural Dean – RD

Clues beginning with S
 Sailor – AB (able seaman), TAR (slang), RN, SALT, JACK, HAND, OS (ordinary seaman)
 Saint – ST or S
 Same – DO (ditto)
 Sappers – RE (the Royal Engineers equivalent of "private")
 Satisfactory – S
 Say – EG (e.g., short for the Latin exempli gratia)
 Seaman – AB (able seaman)
 Second – S or MO (moment)
 Secret service – SS
 Secretary – PA (personal assistant)
 Section – OR (Other Ranks – a 'section' of the British Armed Forces)
 Senior Service – RN (Royal Navy)
 Setter – I, ME, ONE (meaning the setter of the crossword)
 Setter's – MY (meaning the setter of the crossword)
 Sex appeal – IT (after Clara Bow – the It girl) or SA
 Shilling – S
 Ship – SS (steam ship)
 Ship's officer – PO (petty officer)
 Shirt – T
 Short wave – SW
 Side – LEG, OFF, ON
 Significant other – SO
 Silk – QC or KC (From Queen's—or King's—Counsel)
 Silver – AG (chemical symbol)
 Singer – RAT (Rat Pack)
 Sixth sense – ESP (extrasensory perception)
 Small – S
 Socially acceptable – U (upper class)
 Sodium – NA (chemical symbol)
 Softly – P (musical notation)
 Soldier – RM (Royal Marine), RE (Royal Engineer), GI (General Infantryman), ANT, VET
 Soldiers – MEN, OR (Other Ranks)
 Son – S
 South – S
 Spade – S (playing card suit)
 Spain – E (International vehicle registration code)
 Special – S, SP
 Spectacles – OO
 State – any abbreviation of an American State (e.g. CA, FL ..)
 Steam Ship – SS
 Stone – ST
 Street – ST
 Student – L (learner) or NUS (National Union of Students)
 Study – CON, DEN
 Stumped – ST
 Submarine – U (U-boat) or SUB
 Succeeded – S
 Sweat – BO (body odor)

Clues beginning with T
 Tabloid – SUN, RAG
 Take — R (from Latin recipe, meaning "take")
 Tar – AB (able seaman)
 Tax – VAT (value added tax)
 Teacher – DON
 Teachers – NUT (National Union of Teachers)
 Team – XI (Roman numerals for eleven players in a football or cricket team)
 Teetotal – TT or AA (from Alcoholics Anonymous)
 Ten – X (Roman numerals) or IO (IO looks like 10)
 Territorial Army – TA
 Terrorists – ETA (Basque Nationalists), IRA (Irish Republican Army), UFF (Ulster Freedom Fighters), UDA (Ulster Defence Association)
 Thanks – TA
 That is – IE (from the Latin id est) or SC, SS (both from the Latin scilicet meaning namely = that is)
 Theatre – REP (The Rep)
 Theologian – DD (Doctor of Divinity)
 This month – INST (from the Latin instante mense)
 Thousand – G (grand), M (Roman numeral), or K (kilo-)
 Thus – IE (short for the Latin id est), SO, SIC
 Time – T, S, M, AGE
 Times – X (multiplication symbol)
 Toilet – WC (water closet)
 Tory – CON (slang for Conservative)
 Trendy – IN (euphemism)
 Tripod – Y (shape of a Tripod)
 Troop – RM (Royal Marine)
 Tungsten – W (chemical symbol)
 Tyro – L (for learner)

Clues beginning with U
 Ulster – NI (Northern Ireland)
 Ulster Defence Association – UDA
 Ulster Freedom Fighters – UFF
 Ultimate – Z (last or ultimate letter of the alphabet)
United - U (Man U., common abbreviation of Manchester United F.C.)
 United Nations – UN
 University – U or OU (Open University) or UP (in the UK one goes up to university)
 Unknown – X, Y or Z (mathematical variable)

Clues beginning with V
 Value added tax – VAT
 Variable – X, Y or Z (mathematical unknown)
 Version – V
 Versus – V or VS
 Very – V
 Vessel – SS
 Viscount – VIS (abbreviation)
 Volunteers – TA (Territorial Army)
 Vote – X

Clues beginning with W
 Way – RD (road), ST (street), AVE (avenue)
 Weekend - SS (Saturday/Sunday)
 Weight – G (gram), LB (pound)
 Wheel – O
 Whistle-blower – REF (referee)
 Wide – W (cricket)
 Wife – W
 Wine – ASTI, RED, CAVA, DOC, HOCK
 With – W
 Without – WO
 Work – W, OP (operation), OPUS (classical music)
 Worker – ANT, BEE, ARM

Clues beginning with X
 X – IO (The letters IO look like the number 10)

Clues beginning with Y
 Yard – YD or Y
 Year – Y or YR
 Yours truly – ID or I

Clues beginning with Z
 Zero – O (the letter O looks like the number 0) or Z

Further reading

External links

 Reverse A–Z list of abbreviations
 Extensive list of abbreviations
 Crossword Abbreviations

Crosswords
Abbreviations